Coriomeris is a genus of leaf-footed bugs in the family Coreidae. There are about 19 described species in Coriomeris.

Species
These 19 species belong to the genus Coriomeris:

 Coriomeris affinis (Herrich-Schäffer, 1839)
 Coriomeris alpinus (Horváth, 1895)
 Coriomeris apricus Kiritshenko, 1952
 Coriomeris armeniacus Tshernova, 1978
 Coriomeris bergevini Poppius, 1912
 Coriomeris brevicornis Lindberg, 1923
 Coriomeris denticulatus (Scopoli, 1763)
 Coriomeris echinatus Putshkov, 1968
 Coriomeris hirticornis (Fabricius, 1794)
 Coriomeris humilis (Uhler, 1872)
 Coriomeris insularis Dolling & Yonke, 1976
 Coriomeris integerrimus Jakovlev, 1904
 Coriomeris nigricornis (Stål, 1870)
 Coriomeris occidentalis Dolling & Yonke, 1976
 Coriomeris pallidus Reuter, 1900
 Coriomeris scabricornis (Panzer, 1805)
 Coriomeris subglaber Horváth, 1917
 Coriomeris validicornis Jakovlev, 1904
 Coriomeris vitticollis Reuter, 1900

References

Further reading

External links

 

Articles created by Qbugbot
Coreidae genera
Pseudophloeinae